Pard Sar (also Romanized as Pordesar; also known as Pardeh Sar, Pordehsar, and Purteser) is a village in Markiyeh Rural District, Mirza Kuchek Janghli District, Sowme'eh Sara County, Gilan Province, Iran. At the 2006 census, its population was 129, in 39 families.

References 

Populated places in Sowme'eh Sara County